Perfluorotoluene or octafluorotoluene is a chemical which belongs to the class of fluorocarbons, sometimes referred to as perfluorocarbons or PFCs. Fluorocarbons and their derivatives are useful fluoropolymers, refrigerants, solvents, and anesthetics.

More specifically, perfluorotoluene is a kind of perfluorocarbon, which is a type of perfluoroaromatic compounds in which they contain only carbon and fluorine like other fluorocarbons, but also contain an aromatic ring. Other examples include hexafluorobenzene and octafluoronaphthalene. Perfluorotoluene is commonly used as industrial solvent and can be prepared by defluorination of perfluoromethylcyclohexane by heating to 500 °C with a nickel or iron catalyst.

References

Fluorocarbons
Halogenated solvents
Coolants
Trifluoromethyl compounds